Luisa Illková (born 2 May 1988) is a Czech curler.

Teams

Women's

Mixed

Personal life
She started curling in 2003.

References

External links

Illková Luisa - Player statistics (all games with his/her participation) - Czech Curling Association

Living people
1988 births
Czech female curlers
Czech curling champions
Competitors at the 2009 Winter Universiade
Place of birth missing (living people)